Zodiac is an album led by saxophonist Cecil Payne recorded in 1968 but not released on the Strata-East label until 1973.

Reception

In his review for AllMusic, Ron Wynn called it an "outstanding date".

Track listing
All compositions by Cecil Payne
 "Martin Luther King, Jr." - 6:55
 "I Know Love" - 2:09
 "Girl, You Got a Home" - 10:48
 "Slide Hampton" - 4:21
 "Follow Me" - 9:16
 "Flying Fish" - 12:20

Personnel
Cecil Payne - baritone saxophone, alto saxophone
Kenny Dorham - trumpet
Wynton Kelly - piano, organ
Wilbur Ware - bass 
Albert Kuumba Heath - drums

References

1973 albums
Cecil Payne albums
Strata-East Records albums